The pair skating event was held as part of the figure skating at the 1928 Winter Olympics. It was the fourth appearance of the event, which had previously been held at the Summer Olympics in 1908 and 1920 and was also part of the first Winter Games in 1924. The competition was held on Sunday, 19 February 1928. Twenty-six figure skaters from ten nations competed.

Results

Referee:
  M. V. Lundquist

Judges:
  Heinrich Burger
  Sakari Ilmanen
  J.G. Künzli
  Joel B. Liberman
  Walter Muller
  Francis Pigueron
  Thomas D. Richardson
  Josef Slíva
  Edouard Delpy

References

External links
 Official Olympic Report
 sports-reference
 

Figure skating at the 1928 Winter Olympics
1928 in figure skating
1928
Mixed events at the 1928 Winter Olympics